Gaelic Games Victoria (GGV) is the ruling body for the Irish sports of Gaelic football and Hurling in the Australian state of Victoria. The organisation was established in 2020 and is affiliated to Australasia GAA and the Gaelic Athletic Association.

History
The administration of Gaelic games in Victoria commenced in 1975 with the establishment of the Victorian Gaelic Athletic Association (VGAA). The VGAA was the body responsible for the sports and clubs in the state until 2020, when a split among the clubs resulted in the creation of the GGV. The GGV became formally recognised as the administrative body for the sports by the GAA in March 2020, after a majority of the existing clubs succeeded in winning recognition for the new entity, and shifted matches away from the VGAA's sporting facility in Keysborough.

Gaelic Games Victoria oversees both football and hurling fixtures across multiple divisions, with matches played mostly during the winter months.

State representative teams are sent to the Australasian Championships every year with men's seniors, minors and women's teams competing.

Clubs
Garryowen
Geelong Gaels 
Melbourne Shamrocks
Padraig Pearse
Sinn Féin
St Kelvins
Wolfe Tones
Young Melbourne

See also

 Sport in Victoria

References

External links
 
 Facebook page
 Twitter page

Sports governing bodies in Victoria (Australia)
Australasia GAA
Gaelic games governing bodies in Australia
Irish-Australian culture
Sports organizations established in 1975